Ken Bolton (born 1949) is an Australian poet. He was born in Sydney and studied fine arts at the University of Sydney, where he also tutored. In the late 70s he edited the poetry magazine Magic Sam and began the small press Sea Cruise Books with Anna Couani. His first book of poems, Four Poems, was published in 1977. In 1982 he moved to Adelaide to work at the Experimental Art Foundation.

He has since edited the literary magazine Otis Rush and collaborated with poet John Jenkins on a number of books of poetry. His Selected Poems was published by Penguin in 1992 and in 2005 Wakefield Press published his monograph on the contemporary sculptor Michelle Nikou. 

His collection (At The Flash & At The Baci, 2006) has been described as "prov[ing] to us that Ken Bolton is a prime example of a poet breaking new ground in Australian poetry."

His 2019 book, Salute, was shortlisted for the 2022 Adelaide Festival Awards for Literature John Bray Poetry Award.

Bibliography

Poetry 
Collections and chapbooks
 
 Blonde & French. (Island, 1978) 
 Talking to You: Poems 1978-1981. (Rigmarole, 1983) 
 Blazing Shoes. (Open Dammit, 1984) 
 Airborne dogs, With John Jenkins. (Brunswick Hills, 1988) 
 The Ferrara Poems, With John Jenkins. (Experimental Art Foundation, 1989) 
 Two poems. (Experimental Art Foundation, 1990) 
 Selected Poems. (Penguin, 1992) 
 Untimely Meditations & Other Poems. (Wakefield Press, Adelaide, 1997) 
 At The Flash & At The Baci. (Wakefield Press, Adelaide, 2006) 
 The Circus. (Wakefield Press, Adelaide, 2006)
 A Whistled Bit of Bop. (Vagabond Press, Sydney, 2010) 
 Sly Mongoose. (Puncher & Wattmann, Sydney, 2011) 
 Selected Poems, 1975—2010. (Shearsman Press, Bristol, UK, 2012) 
 Threefer. (Puncher & Wattmann, Sydney, 2013) 
 London journal London poem or "Pendant"(Vagabond Press, Sydney, 2015) 
 Lonnie's Lament. (Wakefield Press, Adelaide, 2017) 
 Species of Spaces. (Shearsman Press, Bristol, UK, 2017) 
 Starting at Basheer's. (Vagabond Press, Sydney, 2018) 
 Salute. (Puncher & Wattmann, Sydney, 2019)

Non fiction
 Michelle Nikou. (Wakefield, 2005) 
 Art Writing: Art in Adelaide in the 1990s and 2000s. (CACSA, 2009)

Critical studies and reviews of Bolton's work
Salute

Notes

References

External links 
 Ken Bolton Contents Page at Australian Literature Resources (poems etc.)
 3 poems at Big Bridge
 2 poems at Sport Magazine
 Interview at Jacket Magazine
 The duck at the top of the stairs long poem
  
 
 The Dark Horsey Form Guide, Archive and Punter's Companion - Critical writing by Ken Bolton
 Ken Bolton Author Notes at Jacket Magazine

1949 births
Australian art critics
20th-century Australian poets
21st-century Australian poets
Living people
Writers from Adelaide
Poets from Sydney
University of Sydney alumni